The San Augustin Mountains are a small mountain subrange located at the southern terminus of the San Andres Mountains east of Las Cruces, New Mexico.

Description
The southern border is San Augustin Pass, where U.S. Route 70 goes from Las Cruces and Organ and turns northeast through White Sands to meet Alamogordo.

The north of the range is delimited by Bear Canyon, an east-west canyon with its outlet to the northeast. Also north is the San Andres National Wildlife Refuge which takes up about a 30 mi stretch of the San Andres Mountains ridgeline.

The high Black Mountain section is on the southeast of Bear Canyon, and is separated northeast from the ridgeline of the San Augustins.

Communities
Organ lies at the southwest foothills; the townsite, White Sands, NM lies to the southeast.  The mountains are southwest of the Tularosa Valley.

Peaks

See also
 San Andres Mountains
 San Andres National Wildlife Refuge

References

External links

Peaks
San Augustin Peak, (coordinates)
Bear Peak Summit, mountainzone.com (coordinates)

San Augustin Mountains
San Augustin Mountains, mountainzone.com, elevation, (incorrect)

Mountain ranges of Doña Ana County, New Mexico
Mountain ranges of New Mexico